Chauhali is an upazila of Sirajganj District in the Division of Rajshahi, Bangladesh.

Geography
Chauhali is located at   It has 19899 households and total area 243.67 km2.  It is bounded on the north by Belkuchi Upazila, on the south by Pabna District Bera Upazila and Manikganj District Daulatpur Upazila, on the east Tangail District by Nagarpur Upazila and Shahjadpur Upazila to the west. Jamuna. The river Jamuna divides Chowhali upazila into two parts. On the east side of the river are five unions of the upazila namely Khaskaulia, Bagutia, Umarpur, Khaspukuria and Ghorjan and on the west side Sodia.
Chauhali is a char area as it is adjacent to the river Jamuna. The distance from Sirajganj district headquarters to Chowhali by road is about 90 km. Due to the erosion of the river Jamuna at different times, the land of the upazila is often lose in the river. In 2014, 10 percent of the land of the upazila was lost in the river.
In the same year, many other administrative establishments, including the Upazila Parishad Complex, were washed away and relocated.

Demographics
According to the 2001 Bangladesh census, Chauhali has a population of 155260; male constituted 81507 of the population, females 73753; Muslim 153036, Hindu 2194, Buddhist 23 and others 7.

As of the 1991 Bangladesh census, Chauhali had a population of 108459. Males constitute 51.37% of the population, and females 48.63%. This Upazila's eighteen up population is 52185. Chauhali has an average literacy rate of 23.1% (7+ years), and the national average of 32.4% literate.

Administration
Chauhali,  primarily formed as a Thana, was turned into an upazila in 1984.

Chauhali Upazila is divided in seven union parishads: Baghutia, Gharjan, Khaskaulia, Khaspukuria, Omarpur, Sadia Chandpur, and Sthal. The union parishads are subdivided into 90 mauzas and 102 villages.

Notable people
 Abdul Matin, language activist, was born at Dhublia in 1926.

See also
Upazilas of Bangladesh
Districts of Bangladesh
Divisions of Bangladesh

References

Upazilas of Sirajganj District